The French post offices in the Ottoman Empire were post offices in various cities of the Ottoman Empire run by France between 1812 and 1923. France was one of a half-dozen European countries, the others being Austria, Russia, Great Britain, Germany and Italy, which had been granted the right to maintain post offices within the Empire. This privilege was distinct from the so-called "Capitulations" which, since the 16th century, had been negotiated with a much larger number of countries and which granted some extraterritorial rights to citizens and commercial enterprises of those countries. Initially restricted to consular mail, these post offices could soon be used by foreign and local businesses and individuals, provided they used the postage stamps of the post office concerned. The system came to end with the Treaty of Lausanne in 1923.

Originally, the post office used postage stamps of France, but these were denominated in centimes and francs instead of the local piasters, so beginning in 1885, some French stamps were surcharged in piasters, at a rate of four piasters to the franc.

Beginning in 1902, stamps of the Blanc, Mouchon and Merson series were issued with the inscription "LEVANT", both as centime/franc, and with higher values surcharged in piasters. In 1905, 15c stamps in Beirut were surcharged with "1 Piastre / Beyrouth".

World War I forced the closure of all the post offices on 13 October 1914. After the war, only the office in Istanbul reopened, operating from August 1921 to July 1923. Stamps of France were again surcharged, with values from 30 paras to 75 piasters.

Post offices
 Alexandretta
 Beirut
 Candia (now Iraklion)
 Canea (now Chania) 
 Castellorizo
 Cavalle
 Constantinople
 Dedeagh
 Galata
 Gallipoli
 Jaffa
 Jerusalem
 Kustendje (now Constanţa)
 Latakia
 Mersin
 Port Lagos
 Rhodes
 Rodosto
 Salonica
 Sinope
 Smyrna
 Sulina
 Trebizond
 Tripoli
 Tulcea
 Varna
 Vathy
 Volos
Four post offices also issued their own stamps between 1893 and 1903: Cavalle (present-day Kavala), Dedeagh (Dedeagatch, present-day Alexandroupoli), Port Lagos, and Vathy (Samos).

See also
 French post offices abroad
 French post offices in Crete
 French post offices in Egypt

Notes

References 
 Stanley Gibbons Ltd: various catalogues
 AskPhil – Glossary of Stamp Collecting Terms
 Encyclopaedia of Postal History
 Stuart Rossiter & John Flower: The Stamp Atlas

External links
 Bureaux français de l'Empire ottoman, specialized website awarded by the Académie de philatélie in 2001.

Buildings and structures of the Ottoman Empire
Communications in the Ottoman Empire
Postage stamps of France
French Third Republic
Philately of Turkey
19th century in France